Sobhi Saleh Moussa (born September 19, 1953) is an Egyptian lawyer and a prominent member of the Muslim Brotherhood.  From 2005 to 2010, he represented the Alexandria district of Ramla in the Parliament of Egypt, belonging to the Muslim Brotherhood bloc.  On April 2, 2003, he was arrested (along with other members of Alexandria's Muslim Brotherhood leadership).  On February 15, 2011, he was appointed to the Egyptian constitutional review committee of 2011.

He was jailed for three days during the events of the Egyptian Revolution of 2011.

External links
 Personal website (in Arabic)

People of the Egyptian revolution of 2011
1953 births
Living people
Egyptian Muslim Brotherhood members
Members of the Egyptian Constituent Assembly of 2012